Solanum curvicuspe is a shrub found in the mountain ranges of the north east of New South Wales, Australia. Purple flowers form from August to October.

References

curvicuspe
Solanales of Australia
Flora of New South Wales